The 2009 Flea Market Cup was a professional tennis tournament played on outdoor hard courts. It was the seventh edition of the tournament which was part of Tretorn SERIE+ of the 2009 ATP Challenger Tour. It took place in Chuncheon, South Korea between 2 and 8 November 2009.

ATP entrants

Seeds

 Rankings are as of October 26, 2009.

Other entrants
The following players received wildcards into the singles main draw:
  Cho Soong-jae
  Kim Sun-yong
  Lim Yong-kyu
  Noh Sang-woo

The following players received entry from the qualifying draw:
  Jun Woong-sun
  Sadik Kadir
  Kim Young-jun
  Hiroki Moriya (as a Lucky loser)
  Daniel Yoo

Champions

Singles

 Lu Yen-hsun def.  Igor Sijsling, 6–2, 6–3

Doubles

 Andis Juška /  Dmitri Sitak def.  Lee Hsin-han /  Yang Tsung-hua, 3–6, 6–3, [10–2]

External links
South Korean Tennis Federation official website
ITF Search 
2009 Draws

Flea Market Cup
Tennis tournaments in South Korea
2009 in South Korean tennis